Igor Bubnjić (born 17 July 1992) is a retired Croatian footballer who played as a centre-back.

Club career
Bubnjić started his career playing at youth level for Daruvar, before moving to the Slaven Belupo youth team in 2007. In the first part of the 2011–12 season, he was loaned to Treća HNL side Koprivnica where he was featured in 13 games scoring two times. He returned to Slaven Belupo after the winter break and made his debut for the first team as a late substitute in the 2–0 win against Osijek on 16 March 2012. He scored his first goal in Prva HNL in a 1–1 draw with Rijeka on 6 May 2012. In September 2012, it was announced that Bubnjić signed a five-year contract with Udinese, but would remain at Slaven until the end of the season.

On 1 October 2018, he moved to Malta, signing with Hibernians. He left the club in the summer 2019 after having played two games for the club and on 7 October 2019, Bubnjić announced his retirement at the age of 27, after being seriously injured for the past three years.

International career
He made his debut for Croatia in a June 2013 friendly match against Portugal, coming on as a late substitute for Vedran Ćorluka and earned a total of 2 caps, scoring no goals. His second and final international was a September 2013 friendly away against South Korea.

Career statistics

Club

References

External links
 
 Igor Bubnjić  at Sportnet.hr 
 

1992 births
Living people
Footballers from Split, Croatia
Association football central defenders
Croatian footballers
Croatia youth international footballers
Croatia under-21 international footballers
Croatia international footballers
NK Koprivnica players
NK Slaven Belupo players
Udinese Calcio players
A.C. Carpi players
Brescia Calcio players
NK Inter Zaprešić players
Hibernians F.C. players
Second Football League (Croatia) players
Croatian Football League players
Serie A players
Serie B players
Maltese Premier League players
Croatian expatriate footballers
Expatriate footballers in Italy
Croatian expatriate sportspeople in Italy
Expatriate footballers in Malta
Croatian expatriate sportspeople in Malta